Admiral Andrew Kennedy Bickford CMG (16 July 1844 – 9 October 1927) was a Royal Navy officer who went on to be Commander-in-Chief, Pacific Station.

Early life
Bickford was educated at the South Devon Collegiate School and Stubbington House School.

Naval career
Bickford joined the Royal Navy in 1858 and took part in the action involving the Huáscar in 1877. He commanded HMS Thalia during the Anglo-Egyptian War of 1882 and became Commander-in-Chief, Pacific Station in 1900. His flagship in the Pacific was HMS Warspite until March 1902, when he hoisted his flag on board the first class cruiser HMS Grafton, and Warspite returned home. Promoted to vice admiral in 1904 and to full Admiral in 1908, he retired later that year.

Legacy
The Bickford Tower erected at Esquimalt, British Columbia for signalling purposes in 1901 is called after him.

Family

Bickford married Kathleen Dore on 16 April 1868 in the parish church of Queenstown (Cobh). She was the daughter of Dr. Patrick Dore of Skibbereen who had died in 1847 from inflammation of the lung during the Irish famine. The mortality rate amongst physicians in Ireland at this time was in the order of 25%, due to the outbreak of deadly infectious diseases contracted by many of the weakened famine victims. Kathleen's mother, Catherine Power, was sister of Maurice Power, Member of Parliament for Cork 1847–1852.

Further reading
 Light Airs and Gentle Breezes - a victorian naval life Story: The Life & Times of Admiral Bickford by Richard E. Bickford (his grandson), published by Tartan Edge, 1996

References

1844 births
1927 deaths
Royal Navy admirals
Companions of the Order of St Michael and St George
People educated at Stubbington House School